Fabio Héctor Nigro (born 29 December 1965) is an Argentine former professional footballer who played for River Plate, Estudiantes, Douglas Haig and Sarmiento, in Italy for Vigor Lamezia, Viterbese, Lazio and Frosinone, in Slovakia Baník Prievidza and Slovan Bratislava, in the Czech Republic for Slovan Liberec.

Career

Nigro started his career with River Plate, making his debut on July 13, 1983 against Platense.

References 

1965 births
Living people
People from Junín Partido
Argentine footballers
Club Atlético River Plate footballers
ŠK Slovan Bratislava players
FC Slovan Liberec players
Expatriate footballers in Slovakia
Argentine expatriate sportspeople in Slovakia
Expatriate footballers in Czechoslovakia
Argentine expatriate sportspeople in Czechoslovakia
Estudiantes de La Plata footballers
S.S. Lazio players
Club Atlético Sarmiento footballers
Club Atlético Douglas Haig players
Argentine expatriate footballers
Expatriate footballers in Italy
Argentine expatriate sportspeople in Italy
Argentine Primera División players
Serie B players
Slovak Super Liga players
Association football forwards
Sportspeople from Buenos Aires Province